Gand Lavar (also Romanized as Gand Lāvar; also known as Gondeh Lābar) is a village in Khara Rud Rural District, in the Central District of Siahkal County, Gilan Province, Iran. At the 2006 census, its population was 73, in 18 families.

References 

Populated places in Siahkal County